Watch My Chops (also known as Corneil & Bernie) is a French animated series about an intelligent talking dog, Corneil, and his "dog sitter", Bernie Barges. It starred Keith Wickham, Ben Small, Dian Perry, Dan Russell, Becca Stewart, Laurence Bouvard and more recently Mark Laidman. The series originally aired from 2003 to 2004 for 52 episodes and was revived from 2014 to 2016 for an additional 52 episodes, bringing the total to 104.

The original French title is Corneil et Bernie. In the UK, the show is called Watch My Chops, named after Corneil's catchphrase. In the United States and Australia, the show was titled Corneil & Bernie.

Plot summary
Corneil is an intelligent dog: not only can he read and write perfect English, but he is much smarter than most people. Since he is so smart, he knows that life does not get any better than being a pampered pet, and so he does anything he can to keep his owners John and Beth from realizing his phenomenal skills. This plan begins to go awry when they hire the pinheaded Bernie Barges to "dog-sit", and Bernie learns about Corneil's secret. Though the two frequently bicker, they form an uneasy friendship, and Corneil finds himself using his brainy powers to bail Bernie out of various scrapes.

Most episodes are driven by Corneil's reluctance to let anyone know that he is intelligent and capable of human speech. The only person who does know is dogsitter Bernie, whose Uncle Rico minds John and Beth's apartment. Bernie discovered Corneil's speaking abilities by accident, and unfortunately he is somewhat lacking in intelligence and mostly devoid of morals. All this puts Corneil in an uncomfortable position, as Bernie often takes it upon himself to be 'the voice' of Corneil, capitalising on Corneil's reluctance to communicate and ignoring Corneil's requests.

In the 2014 retool of the series, Corneil and Bernie start to get into more bizarre adventures such as hunting for a legendary monster, battling a computer virus, or trying to face the apocalypse. Most of the supporting characters are reduced to background roles and a few minor ones get more focus. This adaptation also features more humans who find out about Corneil’s secret, and he begins to worry less about being exposed.

Characters

Main
 Corneil (voiced by Keith Wickham) – An intelligent, cultivated dog who speaks with a northern English accent. He loves the comfort of his apartment and is able to talk, read, and write, which he attempts to keep a secret,  not wanting to be treated strangely by humans. In the presence of his masters, he plays the faithful dog. It is only when he is alone or in the company of Bernie that he behaves like a human, answering the phone, cooking, solving problems of mathematics or attempting to questions of philosophy. He usually either helps Bernie with his problems or bails him out while other times pursuing his own goal with Bernie in tow. His mannerisms are reminiscent of Mister Peabody from The Adventures of Rocky and Bullwinkle and Friends segment "Peabody's Improbable History".

 Bernie Barges (voiced by Ben Small) – Corneil's best friend and dog sitter. Bernie is imaginative and full of initiatives, but not particularly bright. While sometimes stubborn and selfish, he is also well-meaning and provides a good foil for Corneil. He was initially confined to the boring role of dog-sitter, but he soon found a true companion to achieve his twisted kicks with. When Corneil proves reluctant, he can always threaten to reveal Corneil's secret. He usually tries to pursue his goals, with Corneil either bailing him out or helping him. Bernie sometimes acts as the "frontman" for Corneil's goals.
 
 John and Beth (voiced by Dan Russell and Laurence Bouvard) – Corneil's snobby, rich owners. John is an auctioneer and Beth is chief editor of a newspaper. They are a couple; modern, dynamic and a little eccentric. They love Corneil as if he were their own son and care deeply for him. They also place a good amount of trust in Bernie, being their preferred dog-sitter for Corneil. 

 Uncle Rico (voiced by Dan Russell) – A high school dropout and former boxer. He was forced to retire following a knockout that claimed eight of his teeth. Today, he is a caretaker and deals regularly with his nephew Bernie.

Supporting and minor
 Romeo (voiced by Dan Russell) – The captain of the school football team. As his name suggests, Romeo is a great seducer who has a lot of success with girls. Bernie admires Romeo and dreams of being like him. The reciprocal is of course not true, and Romeo does not take Bernie seriously, though can be friendly at times. Romeo hates Corneil, whom he takes for a fool.

 Martha (voiced by Laurence Bouvard) – Another classmate of Bernie's. She is intellectual and often skeptical of Bernie's claims. Martha takes care of the school newspaper, which has many causes to defend, and its network of informants allows it to be effective. 

 Mrs. Martin (voiced by Dian Perry (season 1), Laurence Bouvard (season 2)) – Bernie's mean school principal. She wants her school to be great and have a glorious future but these hopes are usually dashed because of Bernie. As a result, she thinks he is quite the troublemaker and often gives him detention. She is also known to punish students for things that they have not done. Principal Martin tutored Uncle Rico so that he could finally get his high school diploma.
 
 Mrs. Solo (voiced by Dian Perry) – One of Bernie and Corneil's mean neighbors in the apartment building. She dislikes them because they are "always getting in her way" and she once hit Corneil with her umbrella and Corneil made Bernie take her to court.

 Karen (voiced by Laurence Bouvard) – One of Bernie's classmates. She is pretty and smart and she is often seen reading a book. Despite Karen's hatred of Bernie in "Unlucky Break" and "Corneil in Love," a wallpaper from Millimages states that she will marry Bernie someday.

 Laura Ryan – Another of Bernie's classmates.

 Julie (voiced by Laurence Bouvard) – One of Bernie's classmates.

 Frank – Romeo’s friend and one of Bernie's classmates.

 Joseph Scally

Episodes

Broadcast & home media
Watch My Chops premiered in France in December 2003, where it aired on France 3 for its first season, and on Gulli for its second. The series has since aired in the United States on Nicktoons from 2004 to 2008, in the UK on CBBC from 2003 to 2009, and in Australia on ABC Me as of 2016.

Mill Creek Entertainment released the complete first season on DVD in Region 1 on 18 March 2008.  This release has since been discontinued and is now out of print.

Production
This show is animated, produced, written and directed in Paris by Millimages, and the English dialogue is recorded in London at The Sound Company studios. The first season was animated with digital ink and paint, whereas the 2014 revival was animated in flash.

See also
Kaput and Zösky

References

External links
 
 

BBC children's television shows
2003 French television series debuts
2016 French television series endings
2000s French animated television series
French children's animated comedy television series
Animated television series about dogs
Television shows set in New York City